Orbis Litterarum is a bimonthly peer-reviewed academic journal edited at the University of Southern Denmark. The journal covers research on literature in international and comparative perspectives. Its subtitle is International Review of Literary Studies.

History and profile
Orbis Litterarum was launched by Blackwell company in Amsterdam, Netherlands, in 1943. The journal temporarily ceased publication between 1951 and 1953. It is published on a bi-monthly basis by Blackwell Munksgaard, a subsidiary of Wiley-Blackwell, in Copenhagen and edited at the University of Southern Denmark. It features peer-reviewed articles about the general and comparative literature and literary criticism and does not focus on the Scandinavian literature. The journal publishes articles written in Danish, English, French and German. As of 2021 its H index was 9 and its best quartile is Q2.

Abstracting and indexing
Orbis Litterarum is abstracted and indexed in various systems, including EBSCO Publishing, ProQuest, Arts and Humanities Citation Index and MLA International Bibliography.

References

External links

1943 establishments in the Netherlands
Bimonthly journals
Bi-monthly magazines published in Denmark
Literary magazines published in Denmark
Magazines published in Copenhagen
Multilingual journals
Publications established in 1943
University of Southern Denmark
Magazines published in Amsterdam
Literary magazines published in the Netherlands
Wiley-Blackwell academic journals